Anterior segment mesenchymal dysgenesis, or simply anterior segment dysgenesis (ASD), is a failure of the normal development of the tissues of the anterior segment of the eye. It leads to anomalies in the structure of the mature anterior segment, associated with an increased risk of glaucoma and corneal opacity.

Peters' (frequently misspelled as Peter's) anomaly is a specific type of mesenchymal anterior segment dysgenesis, in which there is central corneal leukoma, adhesions of the iris and cornea and abnormalities of the posterior corneal stroma, Descemet's membrane, corneal endothelium, lens and anterior chamber.

Pathophysiology
Several gene mutations have been identified underlying these anomalies, with the majority of ASD genes encoding transcriptional regulators. In this review, the role of the ASD genes, PITX2 and FOXC1, is considered in relation to the embryology of the anterior segment, the biochemical function of these proteins, and their role in development and disease aetiology. The emerging view is that these genes act in concert to specify a population of mesenchymal progenitor cells, mainly of neural crest origin, as they migrate anteriorly around the embryonic optic cup. These same genes then regulate mesenchymal cell differentiation to give rise to distinct anterior segment tissues. Development appears critically sensitive to gene dosage, and variation in the normal level of transcription factor activity causes a range of anterior segment anomalies. Interplay between PITX2 and FOXC1 in the development of different anterior segment tissues may partly explain the phenotypic variability and the genetic heterogeneity characteristic of ASD. In the most recent research, the PAX6 gene has been implicated in Peters' Anomaly

Diagnosis

Management

History
This congenital anomaly was first described by German ophthalmologist Albert Peters (1862–1938).

References

External links 

Eye diseases
Diseases named for discoverer